is an athletic stadium in Fujiyoshida, Yamanashi, Japan.

It was one of the home stadium of football club Ventforet Kofu in 2000.

References

External links

Football venues in Japan
Sports venues in Yamanashi Prefecture
Fujiyoshida
Ventforet Kofu
Sports venues completed in 1985
1985 establishments in Japan